Camillo Wiethe (24 May 1889, Vienna – 10 July 1949, Vienna) was an Austrian otorhinolaryngologist.

He received his medical doctorate from the University of Vienna in 1913, and later served as a front-line physician during World War I. From 1918 to 1936, he was a physician at the clinic for otorhinolaryngology in Vienna, and in the meantime qualified as a university lecturer (1933). From 1936 to 1938, he was head of the department for otorhinolaryngology at Merchant's Hospital (Wiener Kaufmannschaft), and from 1938 to 1945 maintained a private practice on the Reichsratsstraße. In 1945 he became an associate professor and director of the second university clinic for otorhinolaryngology in Vienna.

With Austrian dermatologist Erich Urbach, he described a rare, congenital lipoid storage disease that was to become known as Urbach–Wiethe disease. In 1955 the thoroughfare Wiethestraße (Vienna) was named in his honor.

Bibliography 
 Kongenitale diffuse Hyalinablagerungen in den oberen Luftwegen. Familiärer auftretend. In: Zeitschrift für Hals-, Nasen- und Ohrenheilkunde, 1924, 10: 369-362.
 Lipoidosis cutis et mucosae; In: Virchows Archiv für pathologische Anatomie und Physiologie und für klinische Medizin, 1929, 273: 285-319; (with Erich Urbach).

References 

1889 births
1949 deaths
Physicians from Vienna
University of Vienna alumni
Academic staff of the University of Vienna